The fixture list for the 2022 RFL Championship was issued on 13 November 2021.  The regular season comprises 27 rounds to be followed by the play-offs.

All times are UK local time (UTC±00:00 until 27 March 2022, UTC+01:00 thereafter).

Regular season

Round 1

Round 2

Round 3

Round 4

Round 5

Round 6

Round 7

Round 8

Round 9

Round 10

Round 11

Round 12

Round 13

Round 14

Round 15

Round 16

Round 17

Round 18

Round 19

Round 20

Round 21
Round 21 is the Summer Bash where all seven fixtures are played at the same location.  For 2022 the Bash moved from the previous venue of Bloomfield Road, Blackpool to Headingley Stadium, Leeds.

Round 22

Round 23

Round 24

Round 25

Round 26

Round 27

Play-offs
The play-off structure is the same as used in 2021. The top two teams after the regular season, Leigh Centurions and Featherstone Rovers have byes to the semi-finals and home advantage in their semi-final fixtures.  The teams finishing third to sixth meet in two eliminator games; 3rd v 6th and 4th v 5th.  As the league leaders, Leigh, will play the lowest ranked team from the eliminators in the semi-finals with Featherstone meeting the other winner of the eliminators.  The winners of the semi-finals will meet in the Million Pound Game with the winners being promoted to Super League for 2023.

Team bracket

Eliminators

Semi-finals

Championship Grand Final

Notes

References

2022 in English rugby league